Minimates are a block-styled miniature action figure originally created by Art Asylum in 2002 and now released by Diamond Select Toys. Released in both specialty stores as well as mass-market retailers, Minimates are made for both kid-friendly and adult-oriented properties, giving them a diverse fan base. The best-known and longest-running series of Minimates is based on Marvel Comics, with over 81 waves of figures in existence, but lines of Minimates have been released for numerous other comic books, TV series, movies and video games.

History

Designed and produced by New York City-based sculpting and design house Art Asylum, the Minimates began in 2002 with multiple lines of 3" Minimates based on several different licenses. These included Dark Angel, Star Trek, Kung Faux, Crouching Tiger, Hidden Dragon, and the films of Bruce Lee, along with a Rock line featuring KISS, Rob Zombie, Ozzy Osbourne and Alice Cooper. The 3" Minimate line also included several blank or promotional Minimates—these usually bore the logo of a specific company and were used as giveaways.

Minimates came of age in 2003 when, following a partnership with Diamond Select Toys, a range of 2" Minimates based upon the Marvel Comics Universe was launched. The 2" Minimate body type began to be used for the promotional Minimates in place of the 3" body type, and it was announced that the 3" range would be discontinued. However, a Lord of the Rings line produced by Art Asylum and Play Along Toys in 2004 added a third body type, which stood 2.5" tall, to further illustrate the size differences of the various races of Middle-Earth.

In 2004, Art Asylum and Play Along launched their Minimate-based C3 ("Create Construct Customize") construction sets, which could be used to build vehicles and playsets from the DC Comics universe. Focusing mainly on Batman and the Justice League, the Lego-esque line was moderately successful, but the license terms limited the selling of the 2" DC Minimates to the construction sets, and the line failed to gain a foothold in the market. C3 was discontinued, and in 2006 DC Direct announced that they had picked up the DC Minimates line and would put out their own figures (in 2" and 2.5" scales) in partnership with Art Asylum. That same year, non-construction-set vehicles were introduced to the brand, in lines based on the Speed Racer cartoon (from Art Asylum) as well as both the classic and modern Battlestar Galactica TV series (from Art Asylum and Diamond Select Toys).

In 2007, Art Asylum became a division of Diamond Select Toys, and the Minimates body type has since been applied to dozens of licenses from comic books (The Walking Dead, Invincible), TV (24, Star Trek again), movies (Terminator 2: Judgment Day, Universal Monsters, Marvel Studios), animation (The Real Ghostbusters, Peter Pan) and video games (Halo, Tomb Raider, Marvel vs. Capcom 3). DST has also developed Minimates based on its own concepts, under the brands Calico Jack's Pirate Raiders, Minimates M.A.X., and Battle Beasts, which they acquired the trademark for in 2009.

Minimate product types
Today, most Minimates lines are sold as two-packs, assortments available online or at local comic stores. They used to offer two packs that were shared between Toys "R" Us and the specialty comic market, which includes comic book shops and specialty toy stores serviced by Diamond Comic Distributors. Four-packs are also offered at specialty, as well as through retailers like the Disney Store, Luke's Minimate Store and Action Figure Xpress.

Both two-packs and four-packs have been offered at major pop culture conventions, including San Diego's Comic-Con International, New York Comic Con and C2E2.

Due to license restrictions limiting all Marvel Minimates to the 2" scale, a range of four 8" unarticulated resin statues under the "Minimates Max" banner were announced for 2006, to represent larger-scale characters in the Minimate style. Unfortunately, because of the cost and unarticulated nature of the statues, the line was not well received and eventually cancelled, with only two of the four announced statues released, Galactus and the Sentinel. (Wolverine and Spider-Man were unproduced.)

The Minimates Vehicles line featured original ships and jets from DST's Pirate Raiders and M.A.X brands alongside licensed vehicles from Terminator 2: Judgment Day, Back to the Future and Knight Rider, each in their own individually branded packaging. Each assortment featured color variations between Toys R Us and specialty, to differentiate between the two releases. While no longer offered in assortments, DST has continued to release vehicles individually, including Halo's Warthog vehicles, the Munsters' Koach, Captain Hook's pirate ship from Peter Pan, different versions of the Delorean from the Back to the Future trilogy, and several versions of the U.S.S. Enterprise from Star Trek.

Diamond Select Toys has also produced a carrying case that holds up to 36 Minimates, and comes with an exclusive figure. The first edition came with a Battle Beast, the second edition with a Pirate Raider, and the third, released in 2013, came with a silver 10th Anniversary Minimate.

Media
In 2005, animation students at the DAVE School produced Batman: New Times, featuring computer-generated Minimate characters, as a class project. New Times features Batman, Catwoman and the Joker, and is notable for its all-star cast, including Adam West and Mark Hamill reprising their roles as the Batman and the Joker. Never intended for commercial release, New Times was released as a download on the DAVE School website and was available as a free DVD from DAVE School itself. As a promotional item, the Batman minimate from the Mini-Batmobile set was released separately in a Batman: New Time bag.

In 2006, an animated X-Men movie in the same style as Batman: New Times was produced under the name X-Men: Darktide. Released on DVD as part of a box set containing Minimates of Magneto, New X-Men Cyclops, New X-Men Wolverine and Juggernaut, the movie features those characters, as well as the debuts of Minimate versions of New X-Men Storm, Beast and Archangel.

Currently, Diamond Select Toys is producing stop-motion animation for its in-house brands – Calico Jack's Pirate Raiders, Minimates M.A.X. and Battle Beasts – using actual Minimates, and posting it for free online. A minimally animated commercial using their line of Walking Dead Minimates has also been released online.

Current lines

Past Minimates licenses

References

External links
 Minimates Home Page
 Art Asylum Home Page
 Diamond Select Toys Home Page
 Minimate Database comprehensive reference site
 Minimate Headquarters fan news site
 Minimates Central fan review site
 Minimate Multiverse fan forum community
 Minimate Factory customization reference site
 Cappy Space Block Figure Line-up Interactive Block Figure Reference Guide

Action figures
Toy brands
Toys based on comics
Toy collecting
Marvel Comics action figure lines
DC Comics action figure lines